Franz Stauder (born 28 May 1977) is a former professional tennis player from Germany and current head coach at TC Rot-Weiß Worms.

Biography
His first appearance in the main draw of an ATP Tour level tournament came at the 1996 Gerry Weber Open in Halle where he partnered Pat Cash in the doubles. He also featured twice in the singles event at Halle, as a wildcard in 1997 and a qualifier in 1998, for a first round exit in each. On the second occasion, the 1998 Gerry Weber Open, he took world number 27 Jan Siemerink to a final set tiebreak. From 1998 to 2001 he competed in the men's doubles at Halle every year. He was a quarter-finalist three times, twice with Karsten Braasch and once with Rainer Schüttler.

Stauder, who won six Challenger titles, narrowly missed out on qualifying for the singles draw at the 1999 Wimbledon Championships. In the final qualifying round he had a two set lead over Britain's Jamie Delgado, but the local player came back to win 7–5 in the fifth set.

In 2007, he tested positive for a metabolite of cannabis, from a sample given during qualifying in Halle. The International Tennis Federation ruled that Stauder had "no intent" to "enhance his sporting performance" through taking the drug. As a result, discretion was exercised and he received only a two-month suspension, as well as forfeiting relevant ranking points and prize money.

Challenger titles

Doubles: (6)

References

External links
 
 

1977 births
Living people
German male tennis players
Doping cases in tennis
German sportspeople in doping cases